If Not For You is an American sitcom television series created by Larry Levin, that aired on CBS from September 18 until October 9, 1995.

Premise
Craig and Jessie fall in love with each other. Their only problem is that they are already involved with other people.

Cast
Elizabeth McGovern as Jessie Kent
Hank Azaria as Craig Schaeffer
Debra Jo Rupp as Eileen
Jim Turner as Cal
Reno Wilson as Bobby
Peter Krause as Elliot
Jane Sibbett as Melanie

Episodes

References

External links

1995 American television series debuts
1995 American television series endings
1990s American sitcoms
English-language television shows
CBS original programming
Television series by ABC Studios